Batu Kurau (Jawi: باتو كوراو), locally known as Tukugho is a small town and mukim located in Larut, Matang and Selama district in Perak, Malaysia. It is located 20 km from Taiping, Perak's second largest city.

History 
The town of Batu Kurau was founded somewhere in the 1850s by settlers from Patani. The first leader of the town by the name of Tok Amar Wan Kasa Bin Raja Hulubalang Patani became Penghulu in the year 1859 until 1867. The foundation of Batu Kurau coincided with the founding of nearby Taiping by Long Jaafar who was the officer of Larut district at the time.

Demographics 
Majority of the residents in Batu Kurau are Malays of Patani origin, they are closely related to Patani Malay communities in Hulu Perak and Baling district in neighbouring state of Kedah. The residents of this town still speaks Reman Malay as their native language alongside Malaysian language. Like the rest of Malaysia, the town also has a significant Chinese and Indian communities and also Malays from outside the state.

References 

Larut, Matang and Selama District
Towns in Perak
Mukims of Perak